The following is a list of recurring Saturday Night Live characters and sketches introduced between September 24, 1989, and May 19, 1990, the fifteenth season of SNL.

Lank Thompson
Mike Myers played Lank Thompson in three different sketches. Thompson was a very handsome man who marketed a line of videos to help men look and act more handsomely. Debuted October 21, 1989.

Appearances

The Tonight Show Starring Johnny Carson
A parody of The Tonight Show Starring Johnny Carson, with Dana Carvey impersonating Johnny Carson and Phil Hartman impersonating Ed McMahon.

Appearances

Lyle the Effeminate Heterosexual
An effeminate character played by Dana Carvey who needs to convince others that he is not gay. Debuted November 11, 1989.

Appearances

Annoying Man
Portrayed by Jon Lovitz, he spoke in a high-pitched nasal voice and did annoying things in front of Weekend Update's Dennis Miller, such as chewing with his mouth open, or scratching a fork across a slate chalkboard. These sketches often ended with Lovitz saying something in a calm, cultured, refined tone; for example, "You don't have to yell" or "I love you." Debuted November 11, 1989.

Appearances

Singing Cowboys
A Dana Carvey and Phil Hartman sketch.

Appearances

Hanukkah Harry

Jon Lovitz plays a Jewish variation of Santa Claus. Debuted December 16, 1989.

Appearances

The Continental

Christopher Walken plays a self-imagined ladies' man. Debuted January 20, 1990.

Appearances

Middle-Aged Man
Mike Myers portrays Ed Miles, a nominal superhero in late middle age whose superpower is elder wisdom; he solves young adults' mundane life problems. Chris Farley plays Miles's sidekick, Drinking Buddy. Each episode features a full theme song and introduction, with Don Pardo announcing the episode's title. Debuted April 21, 1990.

Appearances

References

Lists of recurring Saturday Night Live characters and sketches
Saturday Night Live in the 1990s
Saturday Night Live
Saturday Night Live
Saturday Night Live in the 1980s